"Spica/Hanabi/Moon" is a collaboration maxi single containing songs sung by I've Sound's Lia first released on August 15, 2003 at Comiket 64 in Japan by Key Sounds Label bearing the catalog number KSLA-0008. The single contains one disc with three tracks composed, arranged, and produced by Jun Maeda, Sorma, Yū Hagiwara, and Takumaru. "Hanabi" was later used as the ending theme for episode six of the 2013 anime series Little Busters! Refrain.

Track listing

References

External links
Key Sounds Label's official website 

2003 singles
Key Sounds Label
Lia (singer) songs